Showtime All-Star Wrestling and NWA Southern All-Star Wrestling is an American professional wrestling promotion based in Rockwood, Tennessee.

History
SAW began in April 2007, started then business partners Reno Riggins and TJ Weatherby at Weatherby's "SAW Mill," in Millersville, Tennessee. In 2009, Riggins left. He then began to run shows in Nashville, at the Tennessee State Fairgrounds. 

SAW then ran shows at the Former Freddie Morton's Auction House (redubbed the new "SAW Mill") which became an Antique Shop in Columbia, Tennessee, and at the Old Armory Building in Pulaski, Tennessee. 

Until 2012, SAW toured as well. On November 11, 2012 SAW teamed with the NWA (National Wrestling Alliance) to form the New NWA SAW, in addition, SAW returned to Millersville, Tennessee and changed their format, going under the all new NWA SAW Branding. As of March 2015, NWA SAW moved out of the SAWMill in Millersville, and organize events in venues across Middle Tennessee. Under new ownership in 2014, NWA SAW did shows in Rockwood, Spring City, and Dayton.

Television
SAW began broadcasting exclusively on Comcast Cable channel 49 on Saturday nights at midnight. In 2009, SAW moved to Nashville's WNAB, broadcasting on Saturday nights at 8:00 P.M, and became syndicated. In the fall of 2015, SAW left WNAB for the internet until 2016 when SAW returned to Comcast Cable channel 49 on Saturday nights at midnight. It then moved to CW20WBXX out of Knoxville.

Roster

Male wrestlers

Female wrestlers

Stables

On-air talent

Championships

See also
List of National Wrestling Alliance territories
List of independent wrestling promotions in the United States

References

External links

2007 establishments in Tennessee
Independent professional wrestling promotions based in Tennessee
Companies based in Tennessee
National Wrestling Alliance members